AFIS may refer to:

 Advanced Fire Information System
 Aerodrome Flight Information Service
 Airborne Flight Information System, an avionics system proprietary to Honeywell Aerospace
 American Forces Information Service
 Association française d'Ingénierie Système, French chapter of the INCOSE
 Association française pour l'information scientifique, a French skeptical organisation
 Automated Fingerprint Identification System (disambiguation)
 Automatic Flight Information Service
 Amministrazione Fiduciaria Italiana della Somalia (Italian Administration of Somalia) United Nations Trust Territory

See also
Aphis (disambiguation)